Cape Verde–India relations refers to the international relations that exist between Cape Verde and India. The Embassy of India in Dakar, Senegal is concurrently accredited to Cape Verde. Cape Verde maintains an Honorary Consulate in New Delhi.

References 

India
Africa–India relations
Bilateral relations of India